The 1929 Cork Senior Football Championship was the 41st staging of the Cork Senior Football Championship since its establishment by the Cork County Board in 1887.

Miscellaneous 

 Collins Barracks win their first title.

References

Cork Senior Football Championship